Seminemacheilus lendlii, the Anatolian loach or Northern pond loach, is a species of stone loach endemic to Turkey.  This species reaches a length of  TL. It was formerly widely distributed across Central Anatolia but it is now restricted to springs and tributaries in the basins of Lake Tuz and Lake Beyşehir. It can be found in marshes, lakes, springs and streams with densely vegetated standing water.

References

lendlii
Endemic fauna of Turkey
Fish described in 1925
Taxonomy articles created by Polbot